SM U-21 or U-XXI was a  or U-boat built for and operated by the Austro-Hungarian Navy ( or ) during the First World War. The design for U-21 was based on submarines of the Royal Danish Navy's Havmanden class (three of which had been built in Austria-Hungary), and was largely obsolete by the beginning of the war.

Construction on U-21 began in mid 1915 and the boat was launched in September 1916. After suffering damage during a diving trial in January 1917, U-21 underwent seven months of repairs before her commissioning in August 1917.

The U-boat conducted patrols off the Albanian coast in October 1917, but experienced the failure of the seal on her main hatch. The repairs kept the boat out of action until June 1918. But in July a piston in her diesel engine broke, knocking the submarine out of the rest of the war. At the end of World War I, U-21 was ceded to Italy as a war reparation and scrapped in 1920. U-21 had no wartime successes.

Design and construction 
When it became apparent to the Austro-Hungarian Navy that the First World War would not be a short one, they moved to bolster their U-boat fleet by seizing the plans for the Danish Havmanden class submarines, three of which had been built at Whitehead & Co. in Fiume. Although the Austro-Hungarian Navy was not happy with the design, which was largely obsolete, it was the only design for which plans were available and which could be begun immediately in domestic shipyards. The Austro-Hungarian Navy unenthusiastically placed orders for U-21 and her three sister boats on 27 March 1915.

U-21 was one of two boats of the class to be built at the Pola Navy Yard. Due to demands by the Hungarian government, subcontracts for the class were divided between Hungarian and Austrian firms, and this politically expedient solution worsened technical problems with the design, resulting in numerous modifications and delays for the class in general.

U-21 was an ocean-going submarine that displaced  surfaced and  submerged and was designed for a complement of 18. For propulsion, she featured a single shaft, a single  diesel engine for surface running, and a single  electric motor for submerged travel. She was capable of  while surfaced and  while submerged.

U-21 was armed with two  torpedo tubes located in the front and carried a complement of two torpedoes. She was also equipped with a  deck gun and an  machine gun.

Service career 
U-21 was launched on 15 August 1916, the first of the four U-20-class boats. During a diving trial in January 1917, the submarine was damaged when it sank too deep, requiring repairs that took place over the next seven months. U-21 was commissioned on 15 August under the command of Linienschiffsleutnant Hugo von Seyffertitz. A 31-year-old native of Brixen, von Seyffertitz was a first-time U-boat commander.

However, her nose was dented when she hit bottom on another test dive in September, necessitating more repairs. On 29 September, von Seyffertitz steered the boat from the submarine base at Brioni to Cattaro, where she arrived on 1 October. On 4 October, U-21 set out for a patrol off the coast of Albania, but had returned to Cattaro by mid October.

On 15 October, von Seyffertitz and U-21 departed from Cattaro to begin their first Mediterranean deployment. Slated to sail into the Ionian Sea, U-21 instead had to turn back the following day when the main hatch seal on the conning tower leaked and could not be repaired. After her 18 October return to Cattaro, she sailed for Pola, arriving on 24 October. There, she would undergo another lengthy stay in port for repairs.

Linienschiffleutnant Robert Dürrigl was assigned the new commander of U-21 on 24 March 1918. Dürrial led U-21 out of Pola on 1 June for Cattaro, making stops en route at Arbe and Novigrad for repairs to the gyrocompass.

On 16 July, while conducting patrols off the Albanian coast, a piston in U-21s diesel engine broke and Dürrial put in at Djenovic. On 25 July, U-21 was towed to Pola, where she remained until the end of the war. She was ceded to Italy as a war reparation and scrapped in 1920. Like all of her sister boats, U-21 had no wartime successes.

References

Bibliography 

 
 
 

U-20-class submarines
U-boats commissioned in 1917
1916 ships
World War I submarines of Austria-Hungary
Ships built in Pola